Quantum of Solace: Original Motion Picture Soundtrack is the soundtrack album for the James Bond film of the same name. Released on 17 October 2008. The album contains the score composed by David Arnold. It is Arnold's fifth soundtrack for the James Bond franchise. His frequent collaborator Nicholas Dodd orchestrated and conducted the score.

Development
David Arnold, who composed the scores for the previous four Bond films, said that Quantum of Solace director Marc Forster likes to work very closely with his composers and that, in comparison to the accelerated schedule he was tied to on Casino Royale, the intention was to spend a long time scoring the film to "really work it out". He also said he would be "taking a different approach" with the score. Arnold composed the music based on impressions from reading the script, and Forster edited those into the film.

Mark Ronson and Amy Winehouse recorded a demo track for the film, but Ronson explained that she was "not ready to record any music" at that time. It was announced Jack White of The White Stripes and Alicia Keys would collaborate on "Another Way to Die", which is the first duet in Bond music history, on 29 July 2008. They had wanted to work together for two years beforehand. The song was recorded in Nashville, Tennessee; White played the drums while Keys performed on the piano. The Memphis Horns also contributed to the track. White's favourite Bond theme is John Barry's instrumental piece for On Her Majesty's Secret Service, and he watched various opening credit sequences from the series for inspiration while mixing the track.

The soundtrack was released by J Records, Keys' record label, though Keys appears on only one track. The track listing follows the order of the music's use within the film, with the exception of the title song being moved to the end of the album (in the film, it appears immediately after track 1). It is presented in the full-length single-release version, rather than the shorter mix heard over the film's opening titles. One notable omission is the fully orchestrated James Bond Theme, which features, as it did in Casino Royale, only at the film's conclusion, but this time over the traditional gun barrel walk-on-and-shoot as well as the start of the end titles. Another omission is Four Tet's instrumental closing theme that follows it, playing over the remainder of the credits and entitled Crawl, End Crawl within them. This track was later made available on iTunes. Other tracks listed are heard in the film (but not on the album) during scenes such as Dominic Greene's charity fundraising party Jaime Cuadra - Cholo Soy, Jaime Cuadra - Regresa, Jaime Cuadra - El Provinciano; and Puccini's opera Tosca forms the backdrop to a key sequence. Vesper's Theme from Arnold's Casino Royale soundtrack reappears at key moments in the film; it may be heard on the album in tracks 12, 15, 18 and 23.

Track listing

See also
 Outline of James Bond

References

Soundtrack albums from James Bond films
soundtrack
David Arnold soundtracks
2008 soundtrack albums
J Records soundtracks